Section 41 of the Australian Constitution is a provision of the Constitution of Australia which states: Right of electors of States

No adult person who has or acquires a right to vote at elections for the more numerous House of the Parliament of a State shall, while the right continues, be prevented by any law of the Commonwealth from voting at elections for either House of the Parliament of the Commonwealth.

Women's suffrage 
At the time that the Australian Constitution was drafted, South Australia was the only state which allowed women to vote. The drafters feared that if the Constitution did not allow South Australian women to vote in federal elections, they would vote against federalism. Section 41 therefore would allow South Australian women to vote in federal elections, without conferring the vote on women who were not yet allowed to vote in the other states.

Related High Court decisions 
 King v Jones: The words "adult person" are fixed with the same meaning they had when the Constitution came into effect, that is, they refer to persons over the age of 21, no matter the contemporary interpretation.
 R v Pearson; Ex parte Sipka: The section is only provisional; rights acquired after the passage of the Commonwealth Franchise Act 1902 are not protected. In essence, there is no constitutional right to vote in Commonwealth elections.

References 

Australian constitutional law
Election law in Australia